Levia Van Ouwerkerk (or Van Eurek, ; born 8 August 1991) is a Dutch-Israeli footballer who plays as a forward and has appeared for the Israel women's national team.

Levie Van Ouwerkerk was born in the Netherlands, to a Christian family. Her great-grandparents hid a Jewish girl during the Holocaust. Ouwerkerk's family immigrated to Israel in 2009.

She has been capped for the Israel national team, appearing for the team during the 2019 FIFA Women's World Cup qualifying cycle.

References

External links
 
 
 

1991 births
Living people
Israeli women's footballers
Israel women's international footballers
Women's association football forwards
Dutch women's footballers
Israeli Christians
Dutch emigrants to Israel